General elections were held in Denmark on 22 November 1966, although in Greenland the elections were held on 6 December 1966. The Social Democratic Party remained the largest in the Folketing, with 69 of the 179 seats. Voter turnout was 89% in Denmark proper, 49% in the Faroe Islands and 59% in Greenland (where only one of the two constituencies was contested as the other had only one candidate who was elected unopposed).

Results

By constituency

References

Elections in Denmark
Denmark
1966 elections in Denmark
November 1966 events in Europe